Géza Henni (6 November 1926 – 7 April 2014) was a Hungarian footballer. He played in 16 matches for the Hungary national football team from 1948 to 1953. He was also part of Hungary's squad for the football tournament at the 1952 Summer Olympics, but he did not play in any matches.

References

External links
 
 

1926 births
2014 deaths
Hungarian footballers
Hungary international footballers
Place of birth missing
Association football goalkeepers
Újpest FC players
Ferencvárosi TC footballers